Where The Wild Things Are is a compilation album of New York hardcore tracks by various artists. It was the first release on the hardcore punk specialist label, Blackout Records and was released in 1989.

Track listing
All songs written by and produced by the stated artists
Outburst:	"The Hardway"	–	2:36
Outburst:	"Controlled"	–	1:35
Killing Time:	"Brightside" –	2:29
Killing Time:	"Backtrack" 	–	2:34
Life's Blood:	"Reckoning Force"	–	1:14
Life's Blood:	"Counting On"	–	2:13
Breakdown:	"All I Ask"	–	0:43
Breakdown:	"Dissed And Dismissed"	–	1:41
Breakdown:	"Kickback"	–	1:47
Sheer Terror:	"Cup Of Joe" 	–	2:47
Sheer Terror:	"Not Giving Up" 	–	2:37
Maximum Penalty:	"Immaculate Conception"	–	2:50
Maximum Penalty:	"Hate"	–	1:35
Uppercut:	"Down For The Count"	–	2:02
Uppercut:	"Am I Clear?"	–	3:36
N.B.S.H.:	"Hellminded"	–	1:55
N.B.S.H.:	"Desperate"	–	3:09
Gorilla Biscuits:	"Sittin' Round At Home" 	–	1:38

External links
Blackout Records official website

1989 compilation albums
Hardcore punk compilation albums